This is a list of universities in the Democratic Republic of the Congo.

Universities

Other institutions

References

Universities
Congo, Democratic Republic
Congo, Democratic Republic Of The